Eucinostomus is a genus of fish in the family Gerreidae. They are native to the Atlantic and Pacific coasts of the Americas.

Species
There are currently 10 recognized species in this genus:
 Eucinostomus argenteus S. F. Baird & Girard, 1855 (Silver mojarra)
 Eucinostomus currani Zahuranec, 1980 (Pacific flagfin mojarra) 
 Eucinostomus dowii (T. N. Gill, 1863) (Dow's mojarra) 
 Eucinostomus entomelas Zahuranec, 1980 (Dark-spot mojarra) 
 Eucinostomus gracilis (T. N. Gill, 1862) (Graceful mojarra)
 Eucinostomus gula (G. Cuvier & Valenciennes, 1824) (Jenny mojarra)  
 Eucinostomus harengulus Goode & T. H. Bean, 1879 (Tide-water mojarra)
 Eucinostomus havana (Nichols, 1912) (Big-eye mojarra)
 Eucinostomus jonesii (Günther, 1879) (Slender mojarra)
 Eucinostomus melanopterus (Bleeker, 1863) (Flag-fin mojarra)

References

Gerreidae